The Goondiwindi Argus is a newspaper published in Goondiwindi, Queensland, Australia. In 2017, the paper edition is published weekly and has an online site. Although published in Queensland, Goondiwindi is a border town and so the newspaper also serves the community south of the border in northern New South Wales.

History 
The newspaper commenced in 1882. Over the years, it absorbed a number of other local newspapers including:
 Dirranbandi Despatch
 McIntyre Herald
 South-Western Grazier and Agriculturist

It is a brand of Australian Community Media.

References 

Newspapers published in Queensland
Goondiwindi
Weekly newspapers published in Australia